Daniel Celebre (born 1984) is a Canadian dancer.

Career
Celebre (pronounced "Chellibray"), also known as Da FunkyMystic, was inspired to dance professionally by Michael Jackson's performances. He started dancing at age 4 and acting at 17 and, besides performing in dances, his credits also include TV commercials and Honey in 2003 and The Lizzie McGuire Movie.

Celebre was hired as a principal dancer for Michael Jackson’s This Is It concert tour that was cancelled 18 days before its first show when Jackson died on June 25, 2009. He also appears prominently in the ensuing This Is It film also released in 2009. He was also featured on The Ellen DeGeneres Show with dancer Shannon Holtzapffel and appeared with the Top 10 Michael Jackson dancers Nicholas Bass, Mekia Cox, Christopher Grant, Misha Gabriel, Shannon Holtzapffel, Devin Jamieson, Charles Klapow, Dres Reid, Danielle Rueda Watts, Tyne Stecklein, Timor Steffens.

In the Philippines, Daniel Celebre alongside Travis Payne and Dres Reid took part in a collective dance to "They Don't Care About Us" with intro from "Bad" with Cebu Provincial Detention and Rehabilitation Center's CPDRC Dancing Inmates on January 19, 2010. The dance was specially choreographed by Travis Payne, the Michael Jackson choreographer and associate director of This Is It through an initiative of "Sony Pictures Home Entertainment". The clip went live on YouTube, Yahoo and TMZ and immediately captured more than 3 million views within 1 week of its release online.

Filmography
2000: The Other Me as actor/dancer (TV)
2003: The Lizzie McGuire Movie as dancer
2003: Honey  as dancer
2008: Camp Rock as actor/dancer (TV)
2009: This Is It as dancer

References

External links 

Canadian contemporary dancers
1984 births
Living people
People from King, Ontario
Canadian male dancers
21st-century Canadian dancers